The 2012 season was Buriram United's eighth season in the top division of Thai football. The club competed in the 2012 Thai Premier League, 2012 Thai FA Cup, 2012 Thai League Cup, and the 2012 AFC Champions League.

Players

First team squad
As of 9 March 2012

(captain)

Competitions

Pre-season/friendly

Toyota Premier Cup

Kor Royal Cup

Thai Premier League

League table

Matches

Thai FA Cup

Toyota League Cup

AFC Champions Leagues

References 

Buriram United
2012